McGrath Corner is a community in the Canadian province of New Brunswick, located in Wicklow Parish in the county of Carleton.

History

Notable people

See also
List of communities in New Brunswick

References

Communities in Carleton County, New Brunswick